Yuriy Yuriyovych Toma (born 27 April 1996), also known as György Toma, is a Ukrainian footballer of Hungarian ethnicity who plays as a midfielder for Hungarian club Győri ETO.

Career
Toma is a product of the Mukacheve Youth Sportive School System. In 2013, he signed a contract with FC Hoverla, but played only in the FC Hoverla Uzhhorod reserves. In the main-team squad Toma made his debut playing as a substitute in the match against FC Dynamo Kyiv on 4 May 2015 in the Ukrainian Premier League.

International career
In 2018 he appeared for the Kárpátalja football team in the 2018 ConIFA World Football Cup in London. He scored twice in the semi-final against fellow Hungarian diaspora team Székely Land, and scored a penalty in the final shootout vs Northern Cyprus to help Kárpátalja to their first title.

References

External links

1996 births
Ukrainian people of Hungarian descent
People from Khust
Living people
Ukrainian footballers
Association football midfielders
MFA Mukachevo players
FC Hoverla Uzhhorod players
Kisvárda FC players
Cigánd SE players
Kazincbarcikai SC footballers
Győri ETO FC players
Ukrainian Premier League players
Nemzeti Bajnokság II players
Ukrainian expatriate footballers
Expatriate footballers in Hungary
Ukrainian expatriate sportspeople in Hungary
Sportspeople from Zakarpattia Oblast